Places is an album by the Norwegian saxophonist Jan Garbarek released on the ECM label and performed by Garbarek, John Taylor, Bill Connors, and Jack DeJohnette.

Reception
The Allmusic review by Scott Yanow awards the album 3 stars and states, "A fairly sleepy ECM date... the music has plenty of space, is introspective, and often emphasizes long tones". Awarding the album four stars out of four, The Penguin Guide to Jazz Recordings describes it as “a small masterpiece, dominated by one long track.”

Track listing
All compositions by Jan Garbarek.

 "Reflections" – 15:08  
 "Entering" – 7:56  
 "Going Places" – 14:16  
 "Passing" – 11:18

Personnel
Jan Garbarek – tenor saxophone, soprano saxophone, alto saxophone
John Taylor – piano, organ
Bill Connors – guitar
Jack DeJohnette – drums

References

Jan Garbarek albums
1978 albums
ECM Records albums
Albums produced by Manfred Eicher